The Central Bank of the Republic of China (Taiwan) (CBC), known in English from 1924 to 2007 as the Central Bank of China, is the central bank of the Republic of China, once founded in Mainland China and since relocated to Taiwan. Its legal and common name in Chinese is literally translated as the "Central Bank". The central bank is administered under the Executive Yuan of the ROC government.

History

Mainland China 

The bank was originally proposed in 1923 by Sun Yat-sen's administration in Guangzhou, and was established a year later under the name Central Bank of China. Following the success of the Northern Expedition, the Central Bank took over the role of the central bank for China from the Bank of China in 1928, with its headquarters in Shanghai. Before 1949, it was one of China's "Big Four" national banks, along with the Bank of China, Bank of Communications, and Farmers Bank of China.

Taiwan

Taiwan's first bank, Bank of Taiwan, was founded in 1897 during Japanese colonial rule as the island's first central bank.

After World War II, Taiwan was retroceded to the Republic of China in 1945, and the Central Bank of China was moved along with the government to Taiwan after losing mainland China in the Chinese Civil War by the Kuomintang (KMT) and its subsequent retreat to Taiwan in December 1949. Until it was re-established as the central bank in 1961, the Bank of Taiwan acted as the de facto central bank in Taiwan. On 8 November 1979, the newly revised Central Bank of China Act was promulgated. The Bank of Taiwan issued the New Taiwan dollar until 2000 when the Central Bank of China finally took over the task. In 2000 the English name of the Central Bank of China was renamed Central Bank of the Republic of China (Taiwan) along with a host of other renamings under the Chen Shui-bian administration of state-owned corporations with "China" in their name, such as the Chunghwa Post.

Organizational structure

 Department of Banking
 Department of Issuing
 Department of Foreign Exchange
 Department of the Treasury
 Department of Financial Inspection
 Department of Economic Research
 Secretariat
 Department of Accounting
 Department of Information Management
 Personnel Office
 Ethics Office
 Legal Affairs Office
 New York City Representative Office
 London Representative Office

List of governors

Access
The headquarters building is accessible within walking distance northwest from Chiang Kai-shek Memorial Hall MRT station of the Taipei Metro.

See also 

 Central Mint
 Central Engraving and Printing Plant
 Economy of Taiwan
 List of banks in Taiwan
 List of largest banks
 List of microfinance banks

References

External links

 

1924 establishments in China
1961 establishments in Taiwan
Banks established in 1924
Banks of Taiwan
China, Republic of
Executive Yuan
Government-owned companies of Taiwan
Chinese companies established in 1924